John A. Shirreffs (born June 1, 1945, in Fort Leavenworth, Kansas) is an American Thoroughbred racehorse trainer.

Based in California, Vietnam War veteran John Shirreffs began training Thoroughbreds in 1978. He has won a number of stakes races with his most important coming in the 2005 Kentucky Derby when Giacomo scored a major upset. In 2007, another Shirreffs-trained horse scored a major upset when Tiago, a half-brother to Giacomo (both out of the mare Set Them Free) won the Santa Anita Derby. He is also the trainer of champion Zenyatta, beaten only once in twenty career starts, and winner of the Breeders' Cup Ladies' Classic in 2008 and Breeders' Cup Classic in 2009.

In November 2009, Shirreffs became the first trainer to conquer both the Ladies' Classic and Classic in the same year, as Life Is Sweet romped home in the former and Zenyatta defeated males in the latter.

Shirreffs grew up around horses at his family's farm. He served in the Marine Corps in Vietnam during the Vietnam War. Later he broke yearlings for Ed Nahem at Lakeview thoroughbred farm. After that Shirreffs got his training license in 1978 and operated a small stable in Northern California. He is married to Dottie Ingordo.

References
John Shirreffs at the NTRA

1945 births
Living people
People from Fort Leavenworth, Kansas
United States Marine Corps personnel of the Vietnam War
United States Marines
American horse trainers